The men's 100 meter team running deer, double shots was a shooting sports event held as part of the Shooting at the 1920 Summer Olympics programme. It was the first appearance for the event. In 1908 and 1912 running deer team event were only held for single shots. The competition was held on 27 July 1920. 20 shooters from four nations competed.

Swedish team member Oscar Swahn was 72 years 280 days old when he won silver in this event, setting a never-beaten record for the oldest Olympic medallist.

Results

The scores of the five shooters were summed to give a team score.

References

External links
 Official Report
 

Shooting at the 1920 Summer Olympics

100 meter running deer at the Olympics